"Dark Paradise" is a song recorded by American singer-songwriter Lana Del Rey for her second studio album, Born to Die (2012). It was written by Lana Del Rey and Rick Nowels, while production was handled by Emile Haynie.  Nowels and Devrim Karaoglu produced the radio mix of the song. The song was released on March 1, 2013, by Universal and Vertigo Records, as the sixth and final single from Born to Die.

The song received mainly mixed reviews from critics, many criticizing her melodramatic performance, also with the repetition of production and lyrical content. However, many believed the attraction of the criticism proved it as a highlight. Noticeably less successful than other singles from the album, "Dark Paradise" managed to gain some commercial success in Central Europe, becoming a top five hit on Polish airplay. It was also featured in an episode of The Originals, a spin-off of The Vampire Diaries.

The song was recorded by psychobilly band Tiger Army, released in 2018 on the EP of the same name.

Background and release
In an interview in June 2012, Del Rey said she would not release the song as a single but did plan to release a music video in September 2012. However, no music video was released, and on January 29, 2013, an official radio edit of "Dark Paradise" was serviced to German radio stations. On the same day, it was announced that the song would serve as the fifth single in Austria and Germany, and the sixth single in Switzerland. It was released as a digital download in the three countries on March 1, 2013.

Lyrics and composition
Billboard said about the song's lyrics: "Del Rey once again declares her undying love for her bad-boy lover," adding that the song's melody "recalls late-'80s Madonna".

Critical reception
The song garnered mixed reviews from critics. Most critical reviews came from the melodramatic tone of the song, along with the lyrical content and repetitive production. Billboard gave the song a negative review, saying that "fatigue sets in" when this song comes up on the album, and that the song "would be a subpar ballad for Del Rey" even if she had never released "Blue Jeans" or "Video Games". Jaime Gill from BBC Music used the song as an example as why "Born to Die" isn't perfect, saying that "it slumps slightly towards the end, and the glossy trip-hop production grows wearying on lesser [G]othic melodramas like Dark Paradise." David Edwards from Drowned in Sound said along with "Carmen" that they weren't the best tracks on the album, saying "The dreary fallen angel whimsy of ‘Carmen’ sums up precisely the unfocused drift that critics often use to malign her and on songs such as ‘Dark Paradise’, the caricature extends beyond our empathy."

On the other hand, many critics believed that the criticism towards the song attracted it as a standout towards the album. Los Angeles Times named it among the best tracks on the album along with "Video Games" and "Summertime Sadness". MuuMuse highlighted the album as a standout, saying "Yet beneath the song’s gothic exterior lies an deeply romantic sentiment, suggesting that love trumps all circumstances–even death [...]"

Track listings

Credits and personnel 

Credits adapted from the liner notes of Born to Die and Dark Paradise.

Performance

 Lana Del Rey - vocals
 Maria Vidal - additional vocals

Instruments

 Emile Haynie - drums, keyboard
 Devrim Karaoglu - additional synthesizer, orchestral drums
 Rick Nowels - guitar
 Dean Reid - pads
 Patrick Warren - chamberlain strings

Technical and production

 John Davis - mastering
 Chris Galland - mixing assistant
 Larry Gold - string arrangement, conductor
 Emile Haynie - production 
 Devrim Karaoglu - production 
 Erik Madrid - mixing assistant
 Manny Marroquin - mixing
 Rick Nowels - co-production ; production 
 Steve Tirpak - string assistant

Charts

Certifications

Release history

References

2010s ballads
2012 songs
2013 singles
Lana Del Rey songs
Interscope Records singles
Song recordings produced by Emile Haynie
Song recordings produced by Rick Nowels
Songs written by Lana Del Rey
Songs written by Rick Nowels
Torch songs